Kevin Miehm (born September 10, 1969) is a Canadian former ice hockey player in the National Hockey League (NHL) who played two seasons with the St. Louis Blues from 1992 to 1994. Miehm was born in Kitchener, Ontario.

Career statistics

External links
 

1969 births
Living people
Adler Mannheim players
Canadian ice hockey centres
EC VSV players
Fort Wayne Komets players
Ice hockey people from Ontario
Sportspeople from Kitchener, Ontario
Kalamazoo Wings (1974–2000) players
Nürnberg Ice Tigers players
Oshawa Generals players
Peoria Rivermen (IHL) players
St. Louis Blues draft picks
St. Louis Blues players
Sheffield Steelers players
VEU Feldkirch players
Canadian expatriate ice hockey players in England
Canadian expatriate ice hockey players in Austria
Canadian expatriate ice hockey players in Germany